Banmauk Township  is a township in Katha District in the Sagaing Region of Myanmar. The principal town is Banmauk.

Towns and villages

References

External links
Maplandia World Gazetteer - map showing the township boundary

 
Townships of Sagaing Region